The Rani dialect or Lechito-Rani supradialect is an extinct Slavic Lechitic dialect used by the Rani tribe – the medieval Slavic inhabitants of the island of Rügen (in Rani dialect: Rȯjana, Rāna) and its opposite coast. This dialect, because of its closer affinity to the Drevani language than to the Pomeranian area, should be classified as a West Lechitic dialect.

The dialects of Rügen have left no written monuments, so the main source of knowledge about them is the toponyms and personal names of Slavic origin recorded in medieval chronicles.

Features

Development of vowels and sonants 
The development of Proto-Slavic nasals coincided with that in other Lechitic dialects - the  *ǫ gave a regular ą̊, e.g.

Lechitic apophony also shows the development of *ě – before the hard dental consonants it gave *a, e.g.

Proto-Slavic *e before originally palatalized consonants narrows to ė, transcribed alternately by ⟨e⟩, ⟨i⟩ and ⟨y⟩, e.g. The narrowing of *e to ė or i before originally palatal consonants ties the Rani dialect to the Drevani area. No Lechitic apophony *e > ’o.

The Proto-Slavic *o probably developed into the narrow ȯ, denoted in writing ⟨o⟩, ⟨u⟩ or ⟨uo⟩, e.g. In addition, *o underwent reduction to a reduced vowel of the type ə under certain hard-to-define conditions, e.g. ,  <  *Dobromyslъ, *Ľuboradъ. Especially often this reduction occurs in the auslaut, e.g. The anlaut *o- tends to take on a prosthetic v- (*o- > u̯o- > vo-), e.g.

Proto-Slavic *a as a rule gave a, e.g. However, it developed differently in the *ra- group, where it gave re-, e.g. ,  <  *Radoměrъ, *Radimь next to the rarer ra- such as  <  *Radoslavъ and perhaps in the *ja- group, where the records are ambiguous, since, for example, next to  there is  <  *Jarogněvъ. In addition, in the auslaut *a was reduced, e.g..

The Proto-Slavic *u gives a constant u, e.g. (next to),  <  *Perunъ, *Strumenьky.

The Proto-Slavic *i generally gave i, e.g.

The Proto-Slavic *y essentially gave y, e.g. In addition, *y was reduced to ə in some positions, such as. ,  <  *Dǫbrovy, *Lěpylovy.

Yers in weak position disappeared, while in the strong position *ь gave e, e.g.

Proto-Slavic group *TorT switches to TarT almost without exceptions, np. The *TolT group usually switches to TloT, e.g. The *TerT group generally gives TreT, sometimes written ⟨TriT⟩ np. No examples for *TelT.

The Proto-Slavic *r̥ (*ъr) constantly gives ar, e.g. ,  <  *Kr̥ninъ, *Gr̥nьčьky. In the case of *ŕ̥ (*ьr) there was a Lechitic apophony to ar before the hard dental consonants, e.g. ,  <  *Bŕ̥dъko, *Čŕ̥na Glova, while in the other positions *ŕ̥ gives er (also noted as ⟨ir⟩), e.g. Proto-Slavic *l̥ and *ĺ̥ (*ъl and *ьl) merged to give ol, e.g.

Development of consonants 
Primary palatal consonants have dyspalatalized, except when followed by back vowels. This links the Rani dialect with the Drevani dialect.

Proto-Slavic *ť and *ď (< *t-j, *k-t; *d-j) gave c and ʒ, respectively, e.g. ,  <  *Svěťenoviťь, *Blǫďaviťь, with the latter phoneme tending to transition into z, e.g.  <  *Meďerěčь.

The Proto-Slavic group *šč has passed into st, e.g. ,  <  *Gordišče, *Ščapъlinъ.

Written monuments lack the distinction of the series s, c, z from š, č, ž, which most likely indicates the mazuration of the Rugian dialect.

References

Bibliography 
 
 
 

Lechitic languages
Extinct Slavic languages
Languages of Germany